In mathematics, a complex Lie algebra is a Lie algebra over the complex numbers.

Given a complex Lie algebra , its conjugate  is a complex Lie algebra with the same underlying real vector space but with  acting as  instead. As a real Lie algebra, a complex Lie algebra  is trivially isomorphic to its conjugate. A complex Lie algebra is isomorphic to its conjugate if and only if it admits a real form (and is said to be defined over the real numbers).

Real form 

A real form  is abelian (resp. nilpotent, solvable, semisimple) if and only if  is abelian (resp. nilpotent, solvable, semisimple).

The existence of a real form in a complex Lie algebra  implies that  is isomorphic to its conjugate; indeed, if , then let  denote the -linear isomorphism induced by complex conjugate and then
,
which is to say  is in fact a -linear isomorphism.

Conversely, suppose there is a -linear isomorphism ; without loss of generality, we can assume it is the identity function on the underlying real vector space. Then define , which is clearly a real Lie algebra. Here,  and similarly  fixes . Hence, ; i.e.,  is a real form.

Complex Lie algebra of a complex Lie group 
Let  be a semisimple complex Lie algebra that is the Lie algebra of a complex Lie group .

Suppose there is the decomposition  given by a choice of positive roots.

Notes

References 
 
 .
 

Algebra
Lie algebras